"Ultima Lucha Cuatro" (Spanish for Last Fight Four) is the name of the final episodes of the fourth season of professional wrestling TV series Lucha Underground. The first part of Ultima Lucha Cuatro (episode 21) premiered on the El Rey Network on October 31, 2018 and the second part (and Season 4 finale) was broadcast November 7 on the El Rey Network and later shown in Mexico with Spanish commentary on the UniMás network. The episodes are the climax of several ongoing storylines that played out throughout the fourth season of Lucha Underground. As part of the season finale, all three of the Lucha Underground championships were on the line.

Event
For both parts of Ultima Lucha Cuarto, the commentators were Matt Striker and Vampiro, and the ring announcers were Melissa Santos and Shaul Guerrero.

Match card

Part 1

Part 2

References

External links
 Official website

2018 in professional wrestling
Professional wrestling in Los Angeles
2018 in California
Lucha Underground shows
Events in Los Angeles